Riches is a British drama television series created by Abby Ajayi, starring Deborah Ayorinde, Hugh Quarshie, and Sarah Niles. It premiered on 22 December 2022 in the United Kingdom, first on ITVX before airing on ITV at a later date. It premiered on Amazon Prime Video in the United States on 2 December 2022.

Synopsis
Stephen Richards, a self-made man, has built a cosmetics empire and become a strong advocate for Black-owned businesses. After he has a heart attack, there is a fight for control over his empire. His family's secrets come to the forefront, and the lives of his children from his two marriages begin to collide.

Cast
 Deborah Ayorinde as Nina Richards
 Hugh Quarshie as Stephen Richards
 Sarah Niles as Claudia Richards
 Brendan Coyle as Gideon Havelock
 Hermione Norris as Maureen Dawson
 Adeyinka Akinrinade as Alesha Richards
 Ola Orebiyi as Gus Richards
 C.J. Beckford as Andre Scott-Clarke
 Nneka Okoye as Wanda Richards
 Emmanuel Imani as Simon Richards

Episodes

Production
On 15 October 2020, it was announced that ITV had commissioned Greenacre Films to make a six-part series about a wealthy family dealing with a tragic event, created, written, and executive produced by Abby Ajayi. It is executive produced by Nadine Marsh-Edwards and Amanda Jenks of Greenacre, and Alison Owen and Alison Carpenter of Monumental Television, and produced by Yvonne Francas.    

On 11 November 2021, it was reported that Deborah Ayorinde and Hugh Quarshie had been cast as series leads, and that Sarah Niles, Brendan Coyle, Hermione Norris, Adeyinka Akinrinade, Ola Orebiyi, C.J. Beckford, Nneka Okoye, and Emmanuel Imani had also been cast. 

Principal photography commenced in London in November 2021. It was also filmed in New York.

Release
All six episodes of the series premiered on Prime Video on 2 December 2022, in the US, Canada, Australia, New Zealand, Nordics, and Sub-Saharan Africa, and on ITVX in the UK on 22 December 2022.

References

External links 
 

2020s British drama television series
2022 British television series debuts
Amazon Prime Video original programming
Black British television shows
English-language television shows
ITV television dramas
Mass media portrayals of the upper class
Television series by Amazon Studios